George Cochran Doub (July 25, 1902 – October 30, 1981) was an American attorney who served as the United States Attorney for the District of Maryland from 1953 to 1956 and as the United States Assistant Attorney General for the Civil Division from 1956 to 1961.

He died of atherosclerosis on October 30, 1981, in Owings Mills, Maryland at age 79.

References

1902 births
1981 deaths
United States Attorneys for the District of Maryland
United States Assistant Attorneys General for the Civil Division
Maryland Republicans
Lawyers from Cumberland, Maryland